The Old Copper complex or Old Copper culture is an archaeological culture from the Archaic period of North America's Great Lakes region. Artifacts from some of these sites have been dated from 7500 to 1000 BCE. It is characterized by widespread copper artifacts, including tools and weapons, as well as ornamental objects. The archeological evidence of smelting or alloying is subject to some dispute, and it is commonly believed that objects were cold-worked into shape. Furthermore, some archaeologists are convinced by the artifactual and structural evidence for metal casting by Hopewellian and Mississippian peoples.

Western Great Lakes
The Old Copper Complex of the Western Great Lakes is the best known, and can be dated as far back as 9,500 years ago. Great Lakes natives of the Archaic period located 99% pure copper near Lake Superior, in veins touching the surface and in nuggets from gravel beds. Major quarries were located on Isle Royale, the Keweenaw Peninsula, and the Brule River, and copper was deposited elsewhere by glaciation as well. Evidence of mining, deep holes chipped into the rock, can be found in Ontario, Manitoba, and around Lake Superior.

By heating, annealing and hammering, these cultures worked the copper into shape and produced a variety of spearpoints, tools and decorative objects. In addition to their own use, the Copper Complex peoples traded copper goods for other exotic materials. By about 3,000 years ago copper was increasingly restricted to jewelry and other status-related items, rather than tools. This is thought to represent the development of more complex social hierarchies in the area.

The Copper Culture State Park, in Oconto, northeastern Wisconsin, contains an ancient burial ground used by the Old Copper complex culture between 5,000 and 6,000 years ago. It was rediscovered in June 1952 by a 13-year-old boy who unearthed human bones while playing in an old quarry. By July the first archaeological dig was started by the Wisconsin Archaeological Survey.

Other locations
Copper is known to have been traded from the Great Lakes region to other parts of North America. However, there were also other sources of copper, including in the Appalachian Mountains near the Etowah Site in Georgia. The Mississippian copper plates were made by a process of annealing. Ancient copper artifacts are found over a very wide range, all around the Great Lakes region, and far south into what is now the USA.

See also
 Metallurgy in pre-Columbian America
 Etowah plates

References

Citations

Sources

Further reading
 
 
 

Great Lakes tribal culture
Archaeological cultures of North America
Archaic period in North America
Native American history of Michigan
Pre-Columbian cultures
Archaeology of the United States
Archaeological cultures in Ontario
Copper